Dafour was a people of the Lake Chad region and along the Upper Nile.

See also
Central African Republic
Congo
French Equatorial Africa

References

Ethnic groups in Chad